Santa Filomena (Portuguese and Spanish for Saint Philomena) may refer to:

Brazil:
 Santa Filomena, Pernambuco
 Santa Filomena, Piauí
 Santa Filomena do Maranhão

Italy:
 Santa Filomena (Mosciano Sant'angelo)

Philippines:
 Santa Filomena, a barangay of Iligan

See also 
 Filomena (disambiguation)